The programming language XQuery defines FLWOR (pronounced 'flower') as an expression that supports iteration and binding of variables to intermediate results.  FLWOR is an acronym: FOR, LET, WHERE, ORDER BY, RETURN.  FLWOR is loosely analogous to SQL's SELECT-FROM-WHERE and can be used to provide join-like functionality to XML documents.

for creates a sequence of nodes
let binds a sequence to a variable
where filters the nodes on a boolean expression
order by sorts the nodes
return gets evaluated once for every node

Example
   for $d in doc("depts.xml")//deptno
   let $e := doc("emps.xml")//employee[deptno = $d]
   where count($e) >= 10
   order by avg($e/salary) descending
   return
     <big-dept>
        { $d,
           <headcount>{count($e)}</headcount>,
           <avgsal>{avg($e/salary)}</avgsal>
        }
     </big-dept>

First column of the XQuery request shows the for, let, where, order by and return keywords of the FLWOR paradigm. In plain English, this could be read as "Get all departments that have more than ten employees, order these departments by decreasing average salary, and return a report of department numbers, head counts and average salary in each big department". The result could look like:
<big-dept>
    <deptno>17</deptno>
    <headcount>25</headcount>
    <avgsal>12500</avgsal>
</big-dept>
<big-dept>
    <deptno>24</deptno>
    <headcount>18</headcount>
    <avgsal>11327</avgsal>
</big-dept>
<big-dept>
    <deptno>3</deptno>
    <headcount>32</headcount>
    <avgsal>10725</avgsal>
</big-dept>

Example using Microsoft SQL Server
DECLARE @xml XML

SET @xml = 
'<root_element>
	<branch_element>
		<item_1>42</item_1>
		<item_2>27</item_2>
	</branch_element>
	<branch_element>
		<item_1>a</item_1>
		<item_2>b</item_2>
	</branch_element>
</root_element>'

SELECT 
		x.y.query('for $s in self::node() return $s//item_1/text()') as i,
		x.y.query('for $s in self::node() return $s//item_2/text()') as j
	FROM @xml.nodes('/root_element') AS x(y);

References

External links 
 W3C XML Query (XQuery) - FLWOR Expressions
 FLWOR examples
 Introduction to FLWOR
 https://web.archive.org/web/20111008001258/http://w3schools.com/xquery/xquery_flwor.asp

XML